Big Dave may refer to:

Big Dave (character), comics character in 2000 AD
Big Dave (rapper), Australian rapper
Big Dave (wrestler), one of the two members of the UK Pitbulls
 Big Dave, a stage name of 20th century American musician Dave Cavanaugh
 Big Dave, nickname of footballer Darren Moore
 Big Dave, nickname of footballer Atdhe Nuhiu
 Big Dave, nickname of footballer Armand Gnanduillet